Hudson is a city and the county seat of Columbia County, New York, United States. As of the 2020 census, it had a population of 5,894. Located on the east side of the Hudson River and 120 miles from the Atlantic Ocean, it was named for the river and its explorer Henry Hudson.

History

The native Mahican people had occupied this territory for hundreds of years before  Dutch colonists began to settle here in the 17th century, calling it "Claverack Landing". In 1662, some of the Dutch bought this area of land from the Mahican. It was originally part of the Town of Claverack.

In 1783, the area was settled largely by Quaker New England whalers and merchants hailing primarily from the islands of Nantucket and Martha's Vineyard in Massachusetts, and Providence, Rhode Island, led by Thomas and Seth Jenkins. They capitalized on Hudson being at the head of navigation on the Hudson River and developed it as a busy port. Hudson was chartered as a city in 1785. The self-described "Proprietors" laid out a city grid.  By 1786, the city had several fine wharves, warehouses, a spermaceti-works and fifteen hundred residents. 

In 1794, John Alsop of the New York City shipping and commission agents, Alsop & Hicks relocated to Hudson for a brief time. He continued to maintain a part interest in the firm and brought in customers from the Hudson area, including: Thomas Jenkins & Sons, Seth Jenkins, and the Paddock family, among others. After Alsop's death in November 1794, his partner, Isaac Hicks, began to focus more of his efforts towards increasing his sale of whale products-especially oil and spermaceti candles.
Hudson grew rapidly as an active port and came within one vote of being named by the state legislature as the capital of New York state, losing to Albany, an historic center of trade from the 17th century.

Hudson grew rapidly, and by 1790 was the 24th-largest city in the United States. In 1820, it had a population of 5,310 and ranked as the fourth-largest city in New York, after New York City, Albany and Brooklyn. Construction of the Erie Canal in 1824 drew development west in the state, stimulating development of cities related to Great Lakes trade, such as Rochester and Buffalo, although the Hudson River continued to be important to commerce.

The renowned case of People v. Croswell began in Hudson when Harry Croswell published on September 9, 1802 an attack on Thomas Jefferson in the Federalist paper The Wasp. The state's Democratic-Republican attorney General Ambrose Spencer indicted Croswell for a seditious libel. The case eventually wound up with Alexander Hamilton defending Crosswell before the New York Supreme court in Albany in 1804. Crosswell lost, apparently due the influence of anti-Federalist Justice Morgan Lewis. However, enough state assemblymen had observed the trial that in 1805 they changed the state law on libel. 

During the 19th century, considerable industry was developed in Hudson, and the city became known as a factory town. It attracted new waves of immigrants and migrants to industrial jobs. Wealthy factory owners and merchants built fine houses in the Victorian period. Hudson obtained a new charter in 1895. It reached its peak of population in 1930, with 12,337 residents.

In 1935, to celebrate the sesquicentennial of the city, the United States Mint issued the Hudson Half Dollar. The coin is one of the rarest ever minted by the United States Government, with only 10,008 coins struck. On the front of the coin is an image of Henry Hudson's ship the Half Moon, and on the reverse is the seal of the city. Local legend has it that coin was minted on the direct order of President Franklin Delano Roosevelt to thank the Hudson City Democratic Committee for being the first to endorse him for state senator and governor.

In the late 19th and first half of the 20th century, Hudson became notorious as a center of vice, especially gambling and prostitution. The former Diamond Street is today Columbia Street. At the peak of the vice industry, Hudson boasted more than 50 bars. These rackets were mostly broken up in 1951, after surprise raids of Hudson brothels by New York state troopers under orders from Governor Thomas E. Dewey netted several local policemen, among other customers.

In 2020, HudsonUP, a Universal basic income pilot was launched in Hudson by The Spark of Hudson community center together with Humanity Forward Foundation.

Land use controversy
From late 1998 until spring 2005, a land-use conflict took place when St. Lawrence Cement (SLC), a subsidiary of Swiss multinational Holderbank (since renamed Holcim), then one of the world's largest cement companies, proposed to build a cement-manufacturing plant. Supporters cited the project for jobs and stimulating other growth. Sustained grassroots opposition to the project was led by business owner Peter Jung and journalist Sam Pratt, co-founders of Friends of Hudson (FOH). Opponents argued the proposed project violated state environmental regulations and would adversely affect the river, shoreline, and related habitats.

The controversy gained national attention from news outlets such as CNN and The New York Times, as well as media outlets in Canada and Switzerland. The project was withdrawn after New York Secretary of State Randy Daniels determined that the company's plans were inconsistent with New York State's 24 coastal policies. Opponents of the cement project described the ruling as "a colossal relief", and supporters, including the Business Council of New York State, denounced it as "flawed in its logic". Nearly 14,000 public comments were received by the State's Division of Coastal Resources (87% of them opposed to the project), a record for that agency.

LGBTQ community
In the early 21st century, Hudson has become a destination for LGBTQ people. In 2010, Hudson High School openly gay seniors, Timothy Howard and Charlie Ferrusi, made national history when they won prom king and queen. During the same year, Hudson hosted its first LGBTQ pride parade, attended by several hundred people. Lil' Deb's Oasis is a restaurant in the city that hosts queer events and is an LGBTQ gathering space.

Geography

Hudson is located 120 miles from New York Harbor, at the head of navigation on the Hudson River, on what originally was a spit of land jutting into the Hudson River between the South Bay and North Bay. Both bays have been largely filled in. Across the Hudson River lies the town of Athens in Greene County; a ferry connected the two municipalities during much of the 19th century. Between them lies Middle Ground Flats, a former sandbar that grew due to both natural silting and also from dumping the spoils of dredging; today it is inhabited by deer and a few occupants of quasi-legal summer shanties. The Town of Greenport borders the other three sides of the city.

Demographics

As of the census of 2010, there were 6,713 people, 2,766 households, and 1,368 families residing in the city. The population was estimated at 6,648 Hudson (city) QuickFacts from the US Census Bureau in 2013. These numbers include the approximately 360 residents of the local Hudson Correctional Facility.

Population declines since the late 20th century may be attributable to demographic trends in which retirees, young couples, childless couples, singles, and weekenders have been gradually replacing larger families in the city. They have converted apartment buildings to single-family homes, and the number of unoccupied homes and rate of tax delinquency have declined.

The population density was 3,110.8 inhabitants per square mile (1,201.8/km2). The racial makeup of the city was 59.0% (55.5% Non-Hispanic) White, 25.0% African American, 0.4% Native American, 7.1% Asian, 0.1% Pacific Islander, and 5.2% from two or more races. Hispanic or Latino of any race were 8.2% of the population.

There were 2,766 households, out of which 25.2% had children under the age of 18 living with them, 24.6% were married couples living together, 19.4% had a female householder with no husband present, and 50.5% were non-families. 40.9% of all households were made up of individuals, and 13.6% had someone living alone who was 65 years of age or older. The average household size was 2.24 and the average family size was 3.09.

In the city, the population was spread out, with 22.5% under the age of 18, 9.8% from 18 to 24, 27.3% from 25 to 44, 27.0% from 45 to 64, and 13.5% who were 65 years of age or older. The median age was 37.5 years. For every 100 females, there were 106.7 males. For every 100 females age 18 and over, there were 105.6 males.

The median income for a household in the city was $35,117, and the median income for a family was $37,400. Males had a median income of $26,274 versus $22,598 for females. The per capita income for the city was $22,353. About 23.0% of families and 23.2% of the population were below the poverty line, including 31.8% of those under age 18 and 19.1% of those age 65 or over.

Government

The city has a mayor-council form of elected government. Since the 1990s, nine mayors have served: William Allen, Dolly Allen, Richard Scalera, Kenneth Cranna, Richard Tracy, William Hallenbeck, Tiffany Martin Hamilton, Rick Rector, and Kamal Johnson. This period has been marked by unusual levels of friction between elected officials and residents, as the demographics and economics of the city have shifted. The Common Council consists of ten members elected from five districts, and a Council President elected citywide, as is the Treasurer.

Economy
After a steep economic decline in the 1960s and '70s, following the loss of jobs due to restructuring in the manufacturing sector, the city has undergone a significant revival. The economy has shifted to one based on tourism, services and related retail.

Attracted by its quality architecture, a group of antiques dealers opened shops on the city's main thoroughfare, Warren Street, in the mid-1980s. Among these were the Hudson Antiques Center, founded by Alain Pioton, and the English Antiques Center. In the early 21st century, the city has nearly seventy shops now, represented by the Hudson Antiques Dealers Association (HADA). The business revival stimulated tourism and attracted residents, some taking second homes in the city. It has become known for its active arts scene, restaurants, art galleries and nightlife, in addition to the antique shops.

Transportation

Amtrak, the national passenger rail system, provides service to Hudson via the Hudson station.

Columbia County Public Transportation provides local service and commuter service to Albany.

Local news sources
The Register Star
Modern Farmer

Attractions

Hudson is home to the Firemen's Association of the State of New York (FASNY) Museum of Firefighting, one of the largest fire service-centered museums in the world. It is on the grounds of the FASNY Firemen's home, the first nursing home for firemen in the country.

The Hudson Music Festival was an annual event established in 2011 and was New York's largest free music festival. The fourth annual Hudson Music Festival took place August 8, 9 & 10, 2014 and showcased 100 acts.

Hudson Hall, an arts venue and organization, is located on Warren Street in the center of the city. It is New York's oldest operating theater.

Time & Space Limited, a not-for-profit arts organization serves the City of Hudson and the Hudson River Valley Region. It shows a wide selection of independent movies.

A farmers market takes place on Saturdays, offering a variety of fresh organic products from the Hudson Valley area. The market is conducted outdoors in the warm season and indoor in the wintertime.

Olde York Farm is a woman-owned and family-operated distillery sourcing Hudson Valley foraged and farmed ingredients to make seasonal batch spirits. The farm consists of land growing apples for apple based spirits, land for growing grain, and a black walnut tree grove on site at the distillery. The property is part of the historic Jacob Rutsen van Rensselaer House and Mill complex. Rensselaer also had his own distillery and cooperage circa 1805. Today the distillery and cooperage reside in Rensselaer's former carriage house. Barrels are handmade on site to age bourbon, whiskey, and brandy. On weekends, the tasting room is open serving cocktails, local beer, wine, cider, cheese plates, and gourmet grilled cheese. 

Many local restaurants use fresh meat, eggs, herbs, and produce from local farms and agrarian groups.

National Register of Historic Properties listings
With hundreds of properties listed or eligible to be listed in the State and National registers of historic places, Hudson has been called the "finest dictionary of American architecture in New York State". The vast majority of properties listed within the Hudson Historic District are considered to be contributing, attesting to their quality.

These properties include the Dr. Oliver Bronson House and Estate and Dr. Oliver Bronson House and Stables (both for Dr. Oliver Bronson), Henry A. and Evanlina Dubois House, Cornelius H. Evans House, Front Street-Parade Hill-Lower Warren Street Historic District, Houses at 37–47 North Fifth Street, Hudson Almshouse, Hudson Historic District, Hudson/Athens Lighthouse, Rossman-Prospect Avenue Historic District, United States Post Office, William Henry Ludlow House, Elisha Williams House, Oliver Wiswall House, and Van Salsbergen House.

Notable people

Marina Abramović, performance artist
Robert Adams, American sailor and explorer 
John Ashbery, New York State poet laureate 
Melissa Auf der Maur, musician (The Smashing Pumpkins, Hole) and owner of Basilica Hudson, an arts and performance venue
Rashad Barksdale, New York Giants cornerback
Jonah Bokaer, choreographer, media artist
J. D. Cannon, actor
Nicolas Carone, artist
Dave Cole, Sculptor
 Rich Conaty (1954-2016), radio disc jockey
 John Corapi, born and grew up in Hudson, accountant who turned to religion and became a Catholic priest, whistleblower in false claims suit in California, spoke about Catholicism on radio and TV; suspended from ministry by his order, he resigned 
Lynn Davis, photographer
Tom Davis, comedian
Alice Mary Dowd (1855–1943), educator, author
Sarah Stoddard Eddy (1831-1904), reformer and clubwoman
 George C. Ewing, politician, and founder of Holyoke, Massachusetts
Joel Flaum, Judge on the 7th Circuit Court of Appeals
Nancy Fuller, host of Food Network's Farmhouse Rules
 Kevin Geary (born 1952), English portrait and abstract artist
Sanford Robinson Gifford, was born here in 1823 and grew up here; an artist, he became a member of the second generation of the Hudson River School landscape painters. Following his death on August 29, 1880, he was buried in Hudson's Cedar Park Cemetery.
Kirsten Gillibrand, politician, lawyer, and member of the United States Senate 
Malcolm Gladwell - author, essayist, journalist, storyteller, podcast host
Bibbe Hansen - performance artist, actress, musician
Gaby Hofmann - actress
Hezekiah Lord Hosmer - first chief justice of the Montana Territory Supreme Court
Joshua Lee, US congressman
Tyler Lydon, basketball player, first-round selection in 2017 NBA draft
Sam J. Miller, science fiction author
Alex MacKinnon, darts player
Meshell Ndegeocello, musician
Benjamin Moore Norman, author and book dealer
Elvis Perkins, musician
Dawn Langley Simmons, author and famous hermaphrodite (Simmons lived quietly in Hudson during the 1980s while writing her biography of Margaret Rutherford)
Tommy Stinson, musician
Bob Trowbridge, former Major League Baseball pitcher
Chris Urbanowicz, musician
Martin Van Buren, US president, set up his first law office in Hudson.
William Jenkins Worth, was born on Union Street in Hudson and grew up here. He entered the military and served as a general during the Mexican–American War. Worth Avenue in Hudson is named after him, as is Fort Worth, Texas.
Rupert Wyatt (film maker)

In popular culture
Several movies and television shows have been filmed in Hudson:
Odds Against Tomorrow (1959), starring Harry Belafonte and Robert Ryan
Ironweed, starring Jack Nicholson and Meryl Streep
Nobody's Fool (1994 film), starring Paul Newman.
 The PBS documentary Two Square Miles, directed by Barbara Ettinger, is about Hudson.
Our Town: Hudson, WHMT Aired: 2011
 Hudson is referenced throughout the series Gossip Girl as the home of Alison Humphrey and later Jenny Humphrey
 Hudson is the town in which author Lionel Shriver set her 2020 novel The Motion of the Body Through Space.

See also

References

External links

 City of Hudson official website
 Hudson Area Library
 Hudson-Athens Lighthouse
 Our Town: Hudson   Documentary produced by WMHT (TV)
 

 
Artist colonies
Cities in New York (state)
County seats in New York (state)
Gay villages in New York (state)
Cities in Columbia County, New York
New York (state) populated places on the Hudson River